Abed-nego Bandim (born 12 February 1977) is a Ghanaian politician who is a member of the National Democratic Congress. He is the member of parliament for the Bunkpurugu (Nyankpanduri District) in the North East Region of Ghana.

Early life and education 
Abed-Nego hails from Nakpanduri in the North East Region. He holds Masters of Law in Information Communication and Technology Law He obtained his WAEC certificate in 1995

Personal life 
Abed-Nego is a Christian He is the Chief Manager at National Communication Authority (NCA).

References 

Ghanaian MPs 2021–2025
Living people
1977 births
National Democratic Congress (Ghana) politicians